Consulate and Embassy of Kazakhstan to Canada, Ottawa is the diplomatic mission of Kazakhstan in Canada. The embassy is located at 150 Metcalfe St., Suites 702, Ottawa, ON, K2P 1P1.

References

External links
Consulate and Embassy of the Republic of Kazakhstan to Canada, Ottawa

Kazakhstan
Ottawa
Canada–Kazakhstan relations